Martin Daly is an Emeritus Professor of Psychology at McMaster University in Hamilton, Ontario, Canada, and author of many influential papers on evolutionary psychology. His current research topics include an evolutionary perspective on risk-taking and interpersonal violence, especially male-male conflict and family violence. He and his wife, the late Margo Wilson, were formerly editors-in-chief of the journal Evolution and Human Behavior and presidents of the Human Behavior and Evolution Society.

He was named a Fellow of the Royal Society of Canada in 1998.

Daly is one of the main researchers of the Cinderella effect.

Books 

(All books except Killing the Competition  co-authored with Margo Wilson)

 Sex, Evolution, and Behaviour (1978)
 Homicide (1988)
 The truth about Cinderella:  A Darwinian view of parental love. (1998)
 Killing the Competition: Economic Inequality and Homicide (2016)

References

External links 
 Personal web site
 Evolution & Human Behavior
 Curriculum vitae
 

1944 births
Living people
Evolutionary psychologists
Human evolution theorists
Human Behavior and Evolution Society
Canadian psychologists
Fellows of the Royal Society of Canada
Academic staff of McMaster University
Scientists from Toronto